Daniel Yemin is an American vocalist and musician in the melodic hardcore punk scene.

Yemin also played in Resurrection (sic). Since 2001, he has been the vocalist of Jade Tree Records hardcore band Paint It Black, and still plays guitar in Lifetime, who reformed in late 2005. He also plays bass in Armalite, a band fronted by Adam Goren whose debut album is available through No Idea Records. Additionally, he recently started a new band called Open City with fellow Paint It Black member Andy Nelson and Bridge and Tunnel guitarist Rachel Rubino in Philadelphia. They released their self-titled debut in January 2017.

Yemin grew up in Westfield, New Jersey.

After Kid Dynamite broke up in 2000, Yemin suffered a stroke. Rather than settling down after this event, he formed Paint It Black, whose first album was named CVA, an abbreviation for cerebrovascular accident, in reference to his illness.

Yemin has a doctorate in psychology from Widener University and is a practicing child and teen psychologist in the Philadelphia suburbs of Ardmore and Paoli. He is also a vegan.

Discography

Lifetime
Lifetime 7" (New Age Records 1991)
Ghost 12" (Break Even Point Records 1992)
It's For Life compilation album (Consequence Records 1992)
Background (New Age Records 1993)
Tinnitus 7" (Glue Records 1994)
The Boy's No Good 7" (Jade Tree Records 1996)
Seven Inches (Glue Records/Day After Records 1994/Black Cat Records 1998)
Hello Bastards (Jade Tree Records 1995)
Jersey's Best Dancers (Jade Tree Records 1997)
Somewhere In The Swamps Of Jersey compilation album (Jade Tree Records 2006)
Two Songs 7" (Decaydance Records 2006)
Lifetime (Decaydance Records 2007)

Kid Dynamite
Kid Dynamite (Jade Tree, 1998) - LP
Shorter, Faster, Louder (Jade Tree, 2000) - LP
Split w/ 88 Fingers Louie (Sub-City, 1999) - EP
Cheap Shots, Youth Anthems (Jade Tree, 2003) - LP + DVD
Four Years In One Gulp (Jade Tree, 2006) - DVD

Paint It Black
Demo (2002)
CVA (2003)
Paradise (2005)
New Lexicon (2008)
 "Goliath" 7" (2008, limited to 500, available only at New Lexicon release show)
Amnesia 7" (2009)
Surrender 7" (2009)
Invisible 7" (2013)

Armalite
Armalite (2006)
Humongous 7" (2011)

Open City
Open City LP (2017)
City of Ash 7" (2017)

References 

American punk rock musicians
Year of birth missing (living people)
Living people
Jewish American musicians
People from Westfield, New Jersey
Widener University alumni
Jews in punk rock
21st-century American Jews